Route 953, or Highway 953, may refer to:

Canada
Saskatchewan Highway 953

India
 National Highway 953

United Kingdom
 A953 road

United States